Batuque (meaning hammering from the Portuguese verb batucar, to hammer) was a Brazilian game played in Bahia in the early part of the twentieth century by African slaves which were brought to Brazil but now extinct. A similar game, pernada, was popular in Rio de Janeiro about the same time. Players stand in a circle; one player stands in the center in a defensive position, and another moves around him, suddenly attacking. The attacking player tries to throw the defending player to the ground with blows from his legs. Mestre Bimba's father was a champion of batuque, and research seems to indicate that Mestre Bimba incorporated some techniques into his Capoeira regional courses.

Batuque in present 
There are efforts to resurrect Batuque (and leg wrestling in general) as a modern sport.

References

Further reading
Capoeira: Roots of the Dance-Fight-Game, by Nestor Capoeira, .

Sport in Bahia
Capoeira